Dorcas Sesevo (born 22 March 1987) is a Papua New Guinean footballer who plays as a defender for POM FC and the Papua New Guinea women's national team.

Notes

References

1987 births
Living people
Papua New Guinean women's footballers
Women's association football defenders
Papua New Guinea women's international footballers